Manga Basket-Ball, also known as Manga BB or simply Manga, is a Gabonese basketball club based in Moanda. The club has been active internationally representing Gabon in the FIBA Africa Basketball League. The team is founded and sponsored by manganese mining company Compagnie minière de l'Ogooué (COMILOG). The club name is derived from manganese, which is the chemical element the company mines.

Honours
Gabonese Cup: 1
2019

In international competitions
FIBA Africa Clubs Champions Cup
 2010 – 6th Place
 2012 – 7th Place
BAL Qualifiers
 2020 – Second Round

References

External links
Manga BB Fans Club on Facebook

Basketball teams in Gabon
Road to BAL teams